The sardana (plural sardanes in Catalan) is a Catalan musical genre typical of Catalan culture and danced in circle following a set of steps. The dance was originally from the Empordà region, but started gaining popularity throughout Catalonia from the late 19th century to beginning of the 20th century after the modernisation done by Josep Maria Ventura i Casas.

Men and women join together in a circle by holding hands and facing inwards to dance either the historical sardana curta (with an approximate duration of 5 minutes) or the present-day sardana llarga (with a duration of approximately 12–13 minutes). Other more unusual sardanes are the sardana de lluïment and the sardana revessa.

The steps are meticulously counted as two- or three-step movements taken sideways within the circle. The direction of the steps is alternated. The hands stay on the hip or shoulder level depending on the step structure. The pattern of the choreography has jumping intervals changing with the music. Usually there is more than one circle with varying tempo and levels of dance knowledge.

The participants are called sardanistes. Professional dancers organise themselves in colles sardanistes, colla meaning group or club. All colles are united under the Confederació Sardanista de Catalunya.

Sardana is mainly danced during festivities and on weekends. Sardanes danced during a festival are termed aplecs. Brief public dances are known as ballades. The accompanying orchestra of 11 people, a cobla, includes 10 wind instruments and a bass. One person plays the flabiol (a flute) and the tamborí (a small hand drum). Since the 1980s female musicians are also allowed in the coblas.

This dance stands out from others because it allows people to join a public dance circle at any time, for anyone of any age and background who is familiar with the sardana can drop their coat and bag in the centre of the circle and join in. It is emphasised by sardanistes as the specialty of Sardana.

History
The origin of the Sardana is unknown. The oldest found reference to the word Sardana is from 1552. Its origin is considered anonymous. From the 16th century to the 19th century a folk dance known as sardana propagated around the territory of the present province of Girona. The sardana was a popular dance in Empordà, Rosselló and Garrotxa at the middle of the 19th century. Sardana llarga fits the model of prototypical invented traditions common in the Industrial Revolution. It is believed that the invented traditions are a way to stabilize cultural anchors in a time of rapid socioeconomic or political change. The modern sardana was created in the context of the Renaixença, period in which some people wanted to relate the Sardana with dances of greek origin with the purpose of linking the Classical antiquity with old Empúries while taking advantage of the crescent popularity of the modern sardana in Empordà. With this invented story a myth was started. The invention served the purpose to symbolize the distinct Catalan ethos promoted by the then newborn Catalan nationalism. In fact, today Catalans are known for their musicality throughout Spain and much of Western Europe, so it is not surprising that sardana emerged as a major source of personal and social identity.

Ignoring the myth, the creation of sardana llarga or its evolution was driven by three people: Andreu Toron, Miquel Pardàs, and Josep Maria Ventura (Pep Ventura). Andreu Toron was responsible for introducing a type of oboe-tenor known in Catalonia as the tenora. This happened in 1849 at Perpignan. In parallel, influences to the music composition of sardana llarga include the popular Italian and German operas of the time as well as Contrapàs, a Catalan dance which in religious celebrations preceded sardana curta. These influences evolved into sardanes (plural of sardana) of different lengths. As a consequence, people started counting steps in order to finish at the same time. Shorter choreographies could be accommodated in longer melodies. The new melodies which progressively were made popular required new instruments, increasing the size of the cobla. Similar to what happened with the Catalan language when in 1891 Pompeu Fabra published his grammar, the different sardanes were standardised into what today is known as sardana llarga. Choreography was updated with slight differences from the original North-Catalan dance. Pep Ventura is credited for stabilizing the different variants around a clear  rhythm and making the instrumental ensemble of a fixed size. He included the today's standard long steps (els llargs) and the eleven player cobla band. Though some Iberian and Mediterranean circle dances follow similar patterns, instrumental music for the sardana has achieved a complexity of its own.

In 1850 Miquel Pardàs publishes "Método per aprender á ballar sardanas llargas" (Method to learn how to dance sardana llarga).

By 1860 the dance was popular in Barcelona and from there it disseminated through Catalan towns and villages. Between 1840 and 1860 the sardana was established as "dance of the Catalans". Its influence was extended throughout the 20th century thanks to the dance group "Obra de Ballet Popular", which organised aplecs and other sardana events in communities where it was previously unknown.

In 1924, during the dictatorship of Miguel Primo de Rivera, the sheriff of Barcelona censored the sardana "La Santa Espina". This fact increased the identification of the sardana with catalanism. The creation of associations and cobles grew dramatically thanks to the continuous attacking by the establishment and lerrouxism.

Sardana was temporally prohibited in the 1940s in Francoist Spain because it was considered to foment false feelings of pride and superiority among the Catalans. The prohibition was made on certain locales in and around Barcelona. Nevertheless, sardana was considered relatively innocuous in Spain and this allowed to use sardana as a peaceful protest against the more effective and oppressive campaign to eliminate the public use of the Catalan language. Even more, pro-Franco Catalans continued to dance sardana throughout the Franco period.

Since the 1960, "Obra de Ballet Popular" travels from one city to another with the Flama de la Sardana (Eternal light of the Sardana). Each city is named "Heir to the Sardana" for the year in which it conserves the Eternal Light.

In the year 2010, the Government of Catalonia added the sardana to the Catàleg del Patrimoni Festiu de Catalunya (Catalonia's festivities heritage catalogue) and declared it a festivity of national interest.

In 2015 the Spanish parliament approved unanimously an initiative of People's Party of Spain to urge the Spanish Government to promote sardana for inclusion in the UNESCO Intangible Cultural Heritage. The same vote was done in 2002 in Spain's senate and was rejected due to the negative vote of People's Party of Spain.

Sardana band
Music for the sardana is played by a cobla, a band consisting of 10 wind instruments, double bass and a tamborí (little drum) played by 11 musicians. The cobla has five woodwind instruments: the flabiol which is a small fipple flute, and the tenora and tible (two of each) which belong to the oboe family. These and the tamborí are typical Catalan instruments. The brass instruments are: two trumpets, two fiscorns, and a trombone (usually a valve trombone). The double bass was traditionally a three-stringed one, but now the part is usually written for and played on the modern four-stringed instrument.

In Catalonia, about one hundred and thirty cobles are active, most of which are amateur bands. Outside Catalonia, there is at least one more cobla: Cobla La Principal d'Amsterdam.

Sardana dance

The music written for the dance is a sardana (pl. sardanes), and is usually in two sections (tirades), called curts and llargs, each of which may be repeated in various ways to form the pattern for the complete dance. There is usually an experienced dancer leading the circle.  The dancers hold hands throughout the dance: arms down during the curts and raised to shoulder height during the llargs.

The introit is a few introductory notes played freely by the flabiolist, typically ending with an upward scale and a tap of the tamborí, signalling the other players and dancers to begin the curts.
The first tirada played by the band, called the tirada de curts ("short steps"), is of length between 20 and 50 measures and has a two-measure pattern. It is danced with the arms down: (point-step-step-cross) to the right followed by (point-step-step-cross) to the left. The curts is usually repeated the first time it is played.
The tirada de llargs ("long steps") is of 50 to 100 measures and has a four-measure pattern. It is danced with the arms up to shoulder level, and is more lively than the curts.  However the tempo is typically slower than the curts, about  =100 to 108, with long lyrical tunes accompanied by variants of a dactyl rhythm. The llargs is usually repeated the first time it is played.
The contrapunt is played by the flabiolist, and is a two-measure break signalling the last repeat of the llargs.
The cop final ("final beat") concludes the dance with a unified movement from all the dancers, still holding hands.
A modern sardana dance has the following typical pattern, which shows all the repeats of the curts and llargs:
 introit
 1st tirada: curts
 2nd tirada: curts
 3rd tirada: llargs
 4th tirada: llargs
 5th tirada: curts
 6th tirada: llargs
 contrapunt
 7th tirada: llargs
 cop final

The number of measures in the curts and llargs, called the tiratge or "run", is important to the players, and may be indicated before the start of the dance (e.g. a "run" shown as 25x79 indicates 25 measures of curts and 79 measures of llargs) in order to terminate the tirada correctly with the correct foot, though a method commonly used is to count the measures in the first tirada and not dance until the second has begun.

A dancer is called a sardanista (pl. sardanistes).

As a relatively slow, non-performance dance, the sardana does not require special fitness.  The dance circle can be opened to a highly variable number of dancers.  When danced in the streets and town squares, small circles of dancers can be seen to form and grow: these are open circles called rotllanes obertes, and passers-by can join, leaving their bags in the center of the circle. When a dance circle is too big it may split into smaller circles. The dancers are alternate men and women – with the man's partner on his right – and care must be taken by those joining not to split partners.  Another kind of circle may be formed by members of organised sardana clubs called colles, and each colla may wear its own costume.

In order to dance sardanes comfortably the footwear must be flexible enough to allow the dancer to jump slightly when the llargs come. Traditionally sardanistes wear special dancing shoes called espardenyes made of esparto grass fabric and with two long fabric strips to tie them up around the ankle. Nowadays most people have replaced these with regular trainers.

Many sardanes have sung versions, but mostly instrumental versions are used for dancing.  Recordings of sardanes or sardanes played in concert usually contain the introit, two curts and two llargs.  Sardanes may be recorded for dancing, having all the entrades in order.  Often sardanes are written for special occasions or to commemorate people.

Composers of sardanes
Josep Maria "Pep" Ventura (1819–1875)
Enric Morera i Viura (1865–1942), composer of the most popular sardana La Santa Espina
Joan Lamote de Grignon i Bocquet (1872–1949)
Josep Serra i Bonal (1874–1939)
Juli Garreta i Arboix (1875–1925)
Vicenç Bou i Geli (1885–1962)
Eduard Toldrà i Soler (1895–1962)
Roberto Gerhard (1896–1970)
Ricard Lamote de Grignon i Ribas (1899–1962), son of Joan Lamote de Grignon
 (1901–1985)
Joaquim Serra i Corominas (1907–1957), son of Josep Serra
Josep Maria Mestre Miret (1918–2002), winner of two sardana awards
Pepita Llunell i Sanahuja (1926-2015), singer and actress, winner of the Creu de Sant Jordi
Joan Gibert Canyadell (1941– )
Joan-Luís Moraleda (1943– )

See also
 Catalan shawms, discussing the tenora and tible.
 Cobla band
Assyrian folk dance
Kurdish dance
Armenian dance
Turkish dance
Faroese dance

References

External links

Portal Sardanista
 
El testament d'Amèlia (Joan Lamote de Grignon) Video of a performance by the cobla "Comtat d'Empúries" in Castelló d'Empúries.
La Santa Espina A centenary performance by "Dansaires del Penedès" in Tarragona. 
45-sec Video of Sardana dance and music on Commons
The Sardana and I by Coby Lubliner 
Catalan Dancing in Barcelona, Sardana Dance
Sardana video
El bloc sardanista dels Botet Extensive work with pictures, comments and documentation on all the diverse activities related to the world of Sardanes that the family Botet has attended to since 2001. The family Botet attends to a high variety of gatherings, dances and music concerts.

 
Spanish dances
Circle dances
Articles containing video clips
Spanish folk music
Catalan music
Catalan nationalism
Catalan society
Empordà